Michael Mogaladi (born 7 July 1982) is a Botswana footballer. He currently plays for Centre Chiefs in the Mascom Premier League.

References

External links

1982 births
Living people
Botswana footballers
Botswana international footballers
Mochudi Centre Chiefs SC players
Maritzburg United F.C. players
Association football midfielders